The Westory Building is an historic structure located in Downtown Washington, D.C.  It was listed on both the District of Columbia Inventory of Historic Sites and on the National Register of Historic Places in 2012. The building was designed by architect Henry L.A. Jekel and built between 1907 and 1908. The present structure includes an expansion of the original structure. The expansion was designed by Shalom Baranes Associates and completed in 1990. It also has three-stories below ground.

References

Office buildings completed in 1908
Office buildings on the National Register of Historic Places in Washington, D.C.
1908 establishments in Washington, D.C.